John Frederick Kading (November 17, 1884 in Waukesha, Wisconsin – June 2, 1964 in Chicago, Illinois) was a first baseman in Major League Baseball.

External links

1884 births
1964 deaths
Baseball players from Wisconsin
Major League Baseball first basemen
Pittsburgh Pirates players
Chicago Whales players
Baseball players from Chicago
Sportspeople from Waukesha, Wisconsin
Eau Claire Puffs players
Eau Claire Commissioners players
Seattle Giants players
Chicago Keeleys players
St. Thomas Saints players
Sportspeople from the Milwaukee metropolitan area